Mali Brebrovnik is a settlement in the hills north of Ormož in northeastern Slovenia. The area belongs to the traditional region of Styria and is now included in the Drava Statistical Region.

References

External links
Mali Brebrovnik on Geopedia

Populated places in the Municipality of Ormož